De Nobili School, Maithon is a private Catholic primary and secondary school located in Maithon, in the Dhanbad district of the state of Jharkhand, India. The English-medium school is run by the Society of Jesus.

The school is named after a Christian missionary and Jesuit, Roberto de Nobili, who was the first foreigner to master Sanskrit, incognito, in the sixteenth-century Madurai. He apparently conducted himself like an orthodox Brahmin and is even said to have declared himself to be a descendant of Brahma.

Curriculum
De Nobili is an English medium co-educational school. Courses of study offered to lead to the Indian Certificate of Secondary Education (ICSE) examinations in Class 10 and the Indian School Certificate (ISC) examinations in Class 12.

See also

 List of Jesuit schools
 List of schools in Jharkhand

References 

 Jesuit secondary schools in India
 Jesuit primary schools in India
 Christian schools in Jharkhand
 High schools and secondary schools in Jharkhand
 Education in Dhanbad district